Jacobus "Koos" Issard (born February 28, 1971 in Hilversum) is a former water polo player from the Netherlands, who finished in ninth position with the Dutch team at the 1992 Summer Olympics in Barcelona. Four years later, Issard was a member of the squad that was tenth in the final rankings in Atlanta, Georgia.

References
 Dutch Olympic Committee

1971 births
Living people
Dutch male water polo players
Olympic water polo players of the Netherlands
Water polo players at the 1992 Summer Olympics
Water polo players at the 1996 Summer Olympics
Sportspeople from Hilversum
20th-century Dutch people